The 1935 Akron Zippers football team was an American football team that represented the University of Akron in the Ohio Athletic Conference (OAC) during the 1935 college football season. In its ninth and final season under head coach Red Blair, the team compiled a 6–3 record (6–3 in conference), finished fourth in the OAC, and outscored opponents by a total of 81 to 70. Right guard Earl Hensal was the team captain.

Schedule

References

Akron
Akron Zips football seasons
Akron Zippers football